Federal Route 211, or Jalan Kubang Kerian-Bachok (formerly Kelantan State Route D8), is a federal road in Kelantan, Malaysia.

Features

List of junctions and towns

References

Malaysian Federal Roads